Jeřábek (feminine Jeřábková) is a Czech surname. It was originally used as a nickname for a tall person, based on the Czech word jeřáb, meaning 'crane'. Notable people with the name include:

 Dita Jeřábková, Czech volleyball player
 Jakub Jeřábek (born 1991), Czech ice hockey player
 Jarmila Jeřábková (1912–1989), Czech dancer, choreographer and teacher
 Michal Jeřábek, Czech footballer
 Rostislav Jeřábek (born 1962), Czech footballer
 Václav Jeřábek (1845-1931), Czech mathematician
 Emil Jeřábek, Czech mathematician

References

See also
 
 

Czech-language surnames